The 1922 Missouri Tigers football team was an American football team that represented the University of Missouri in the Missouri Valley Intercollegiate Athletic Association (Missouri Valley) during the 1922 college football season. The team compiled a 5–3 record (4–3 against Missouri Valley opponents), finished in fourth place in the Missouri Valley conference, and outscored all opponents by a combined total of 98 to 90. Thomas Kelley was the head coach for his first and only season. The team played its home games at Rollins Field in Columbia, Missouri.

Schedule

References

Missouri
Missouri Tigers football seasons
Missouri Tigers football